Raymond Elliot was an American football coach.  He served as the head coach at the University of Hawaii during the 1920 season.

Head coaching record

References

Year of birth missing
Year of death missing
Hawaii Rainbow Warriors football coaches